Ammonium acetate, also known as spirit of Mindererus in aqueous solution, is a chemical compound with the formula NH4CH3CO2. It is a white, hygroscopic solid and can be derived from the reaction of ammonia and acetic acid. It is available commercially.

Uses
It is the main precursor to acetamide:
NH4CH3CO2  →  CH3C(O)NH2  +  H2O

It is also used as a diuretic.

Buffer
As the salt of a weak acid and a weak base, ammonium acetate is often used with acetic acid to create a buffer solution.  Ammonium acetate is volatile at low pressures. Because of this, it has been used to replace cell buffers that contain non-volatile salts in preparing samples for mass spectrometry. It is also popular as a buffer for mobile phases for HPLC with ELSD detection for this reason. Other volatile salts that have been used for this include ammonium formate.

When dissolving ammonium acetate in pure water, the resulting solution typically has a pH of 7, because the equal amounts of acetate and ammonium neutralize each other. However, ammonium acetate is a dual component buffer system, which buffers around pH 4.75 ± 1 (acetate) and pH 9.25 ± 1 (ammonium), but it has no significant buffer capacity at pH 7, contrary to common misconception.

Other
a biodegradable de-icing agent.
a catalyst in the Knoevenagel condensation and as a source of ammonia in the Borch reaction in organic synthesis.
a protein precipitating reagent in dialysis to remove contaminants via diffusion.
a reagent in agricultural chemistry for determination of soil CEC (cation exchange capacity) and determination of available potassium in soil wherein the ammonium ion acts as a replacement cation for potassium.
part of calley's method for lead artifact conservation

Food additive 
Ammonium acetate is also used as a food additive as an acidity regulator; INS number 264. It is approved for usage in Australia and New Zealand.

Production 
Ammonium acetate is produced by the neutralization of acetic acid with ammonium carbonate or by saturating glacial acetic acid with ammonia. Obtaining crystalline ammonium acetate is difficult on account of its hygroscopic nature.

References

External links

Ammonium compounds
Acetates